Ancus Marcius was the legendary fourth king of Rome, who traditionally reigned 24 years. Upon the death of the previous king, Tullus Hostilius, the Roman Senate appointed an interrex, who in turn called a session of the assembly of the people who elected the new king. Ancus is said to have ruled by waging war as Romulus did, while also promoting peace and religion as Numa Pompilius did.

Ancus Marcius was believed by many Romans to have been the namesake of the Marcii, a plebeian family.

Background
Ancus was the son of Marcius (whose father, also named Marcius, had been a close friend of Numa Pompilius, who may be identified with Numa Marcius, and Pompilia, daughter of Numa Pompilius. Ancus Marcius was thus the grandson of Numa and therefore a Sabine. According to Festus, Marcius had the surname of Ancus from his crooked arm (ancus signifying "bent" in Latin).

First acts as King
According to Livy, Ancus's first act as king was to order the Pontifex Maximus to copy the text concerning the performance of public ceremonies of religion from the commentaries of Numa Pompilius to be displayed to the public on wooden tablets, so that the rites of religion should no longer be neglected or improperly performed. He reinstated the religious edicts that were created by Numa that had been removed when Tullus was king.

War

Ancus  waged war successfully against the Latins, and a number of them were settled on the Aventine Hill. According to Livy the war was commenced by the Latins who anticipated Ancus would follow the pious pursuit of peace adopted by his grandfather, Numa Pompilius. The Latins initially made an incursion on Roman lands. When a Roman embassy sought restitution for the damage, the Latins gave a contemptuous reply. Ancus accordingly declared war on the Latins. The declaration is notable since, according to Livy, it was the first time that the Romans had declared war by means of the rites of the fetials.

Ancus Marcius marched from Rome with a newly levied army and took the Latin town of Politorium (situated near the town of Lanuvium) by storm. Its residents were removed to settle on the Aventine Hill in Rome as new citizens, following the Roman traditions from wars with the Sabines and Albans. When the other Latins subsequently occupied the empty town of Politorium, Ancus took the town again and demolished it. The Latin villages of Tellenae and Ficana were also sacked and demolished.

The war then focused on the Latin town of Medullia. The town had a strong garrison and was well fortified. Several engagements took place outside the town and the Romans were eventually victorious. Ancus returned to Rome with a large amount of loot. More Latins were brought to Rome as citizens and were settled at the foot of the Aventine near the Palatine Hill, by the temple of Murcia. 
Ancus Marcius incorporated the Janiculum into the city, fortifying it with a wall and connecting it with the city by a wooden bridge across the Tiber, the Pons Sublicius. To protect the bridge from enemy attacks, Ancus had the end that was facing the Janiculum fortified. Ancus also took over Fidenea to expand Rome's influence across the Tiber. 
On the land side of the city he constructed the Fossa Quiritium, a ditch fortification. He also built Rome's first prison, the Mamertine prison. 

He then extended the Roman territory, founding the port of Ostia, establishing salt-works around the port, and taking the Silva Maesia, an area of coastal forest north of the Tiber, from the Veientes. 
He expanded the temple of Jupiter Feretrius to reflect these territorial successes. 
According to a reconstruction of the Fasti Triumphales, Ancus Marcius celebrated at least one triumph, over the Sabines and Veientes.

Death and successor
Ancus Marcius is reported to have died of natural causes after a rule of 24 years. He had two sons, one of which would likely take the throne. A member of Ancus' court, Lucius Tarquinius Priscus, ensured that Ancus' sons would be out of Rome so he could put together an election where he would gain the support of the Roman people.

Ancus Marcius was succeeded by his friend Lucius Tarquinius Priscus, who was ultimately assassinated by the sons of Ancus Marcius. Later, during the Republic and the Empire, the prominent gens Marcia claimed descent from Ancus Marcius.

References

670s BC births
617 BC deaths
7th-century BC Romans
7th-century BC monarchs
Characters in Book VI of the Aeneid
Kings of Rome
Ancus
Year of birth unknown